Charlotte Kempenaers-Pocz (born 11 September 2004) is an Australian professional tennis player. Kempenaers-Pocz made her WTA Tour debut at the 2021 Yarra Valley Classic in the doubles, partnering Jaimee Fourlis after receiving a wild card into the main draw.

Personal life
Kempenaers-Pocz was introduced to tennis at age five by her parents

Career

2019–2020s
Kempenaers-Pocz made her ITF Women's World Tennis Tour main draw debut in Port Pirie in February 2019, where she reached the semi-final as a 14-year-old.

2021
In January 2021, Kempenaers-Pocz lost in the first round of the 2021 Australian Open – Women's singles qualifying.

2022: WTA debut
In January 2022, Kempenaers-Pocz lost in the first round of the 2022 Australian Open – Women's singles qualifying.

Performance timelines

Only main-draw results in WTA Tour, Grand Slam tournaments, Fed Cup and Olympic Games are included in win–loss records.

Singles
Current after the AO 2022

References

External links
 
 
 Charlotte Kempenaers-Pocz at Tennis Australia

2004 births
Living people
Australian female tennis players
Tennis players from Adelaide
Australian people of Belgian descent
Australian people of Hungarian descent